David Fell may refer to:

 David Fell (professor) (born 1947), British biochemist and professor at Oxford Brookes University
 David Fell (politician) (1869 – 1956), Australian politician
 D. Newlin Fell (1840 – 1919), Chief Justice of the Supreme Court of Pennsylvania